The Cannibals is a 1988 Portuguese drama film directed by Manoel de Oliveira. It was entered into the 1988 Cannes Film Festival. The film was selected as the Portuguese entry for the Best Foreign Language Film at the 62nd Academy Awards, but was not accepted as a nominee.

Cast
 Luís Miguel Cintra as Viscount d'Aveleda
 Leonor Silveira as Margarida
 Diogo Dória as Don João
 Oliveira Lopes as The Presenter (Iago)
 Pedro T. da Silva as Niccolo
 Joel Costa as Urbano Solar, Margarida's father
 Rogério Samora as Peralta
 Rogério Vieira as The Magistrate
 António Loja Neves as The Baron
 Luís Madureira
 Teresa Côrte-Real
 José Manuel Mendes
 Cândido Ferreira
 Glória de Matos (as Glória Matos)

See also
 List of submissions to the 62nd Academy Awards for Best Foreign Language Film
 List of Portuguese submissions for the Academy Award for Best Foreign Language Film

References

External links
 

1988 films
1980s Portuguese-language films
1988 drama films
Films directed by Manoel de Oliveira
Films produced by Paulo Branco
Portuguese drama films